Christian Köppel (born 3 November 1994) is a German professional footballer who plays as a left-back.

References

External links
 
 
 

1994 births
Living people
Footballers from Munich
German footballers
Association football fullbacks
TSV 1860 Munich II players
TSV 1860 Munich players
1. FC Schweinfurt 05 players
FC Augsburg II players
3. Liga players
Regionalliga players